Weyhill Preparatory School was established by Tanglin Trust Ltd in 1971, in response to the ever-growing waiting lists at Tanglin Preparatory School in Singapore. The school was established on Portsdown Road on the site of the previous Wessex Infant School which ceased to exist following the repatriation of British Armed Forces. The school was a two-storey block and consisted of ten classrooms and a large hall complete with stage. In addition there was an administration block and separate toilet blocks.

Mrs Veronica Goodban, who was already a teacher at Tanglin Preparatory School, was appointed and stayed on as the school's one and only Headmistress. The school colours were blue and white and this was reflected in the girls blue and white gingham check dresses. Boys wore light blue shirts and dark blue shorts not dissimilar to the present day Tanglin Trust School school uniforms. Initially the school didn't have much outdoor space apart from the grass around the building which was not sufficient for a soccer pitch but could accommodate one reasonably sized netball court. In 1976 Raeburn Park School, under management by the same Board of Governors, moved into the vacated school building (formerly the Pasir Panjang Junior School)  next door. Although the schools were operated separately, the outside space between the two schools was turned into a shared playing field allowing both Raeburn and Weyhill students to enjoy soccer, sports days and other activities on a rota basis.

In 1981 Weyhill Preparatory School ceased to exist when it amalgamated with Tanglin Preparatory and Raeburn Park Schools to form Tanglin Infant School and Tanglin Junior School. The memory of Wessex Infant School has lived on because one of the senior houses within the present-day Tanglin Trust School is called ‘Wessex’.

Alumni
The school has a thriving Alumni community which is designed to help current and former students stay in touch with each other and with the present day Tanglin Trust School. Children of Weyhill Preparatory School Alumni qualify for priority entry at Tanglin Trust School, subject to producing documentary evidence of attendance. Additionally there is a Friends of Tanglin network which is open to all current and former teachers, support staff, Governors and parents.

References

External links

Primary schools in Singapore
Educational institutions established in 1971